Vital Signs is the second album by the Christian rock band White Heart and the band's first with vocalist Scott Douglas, who replaced Steve Green, released in 1984 on Home Sweet Home Records. By this time, Green had already started his solo recording career with the release of his self-titled debut album released the same year as White Heart's Vital Signs. The album features their first Christian radio number-one hit "We Are His Hands" featuring Green singing background vocals and part of the choir at the end of the song. Vital Signs peaked at number nine on the Billboard Top Inspirational Albums chart.

Track listing 
 "Sing Unto the Lamb" (Billy Smiley, Dann Huff, Mark Gersmehl) – 3:15 
 "Draw the Line" (Smiley, Gersmehl, Dwight Liles) – 4:38
 "Walking in the Light" (Smiley, Gersmehl)– 3:56 	
 "Carried Away (Safe on the Wings of the Lord)" (Smiley, Gersmehl, Steve Chapman) – 4:19
 "Quiet Love" (Smiley, Gersmehl) – 3:52
 "Following the King" (Smiley, Gersmehl) – 4:05
 "Let Your First Thought Be Love" (Smiley, Gersmehl, Huff)– 3:51
 "Undercover" (Smiley, Gersmehl) – 3:54 
 "Vital Signs" (Smiley, Gersmehl, Huff, Gary Lunn) – 3:50
 "We Are His Hands" (Gersmehl) – 4:13

Personnel 

White Heart
 Scott Douglas – lead vocals (1, 2, 4, 6, 9, 10), backing vocals (1, 2, 4–6)
 Mark Gersmehl – synthesizers, pianos, backing vocals (1–7, 9), lead vocals (2, 8), synth solo (6), arrangements
 Billy Smiley – pianos, acoustic guitar, backing vocals, lead vocals (9), arrangements
 Dann Huff – rhythm and lead guitars, acoustic guitar, guitar solo (2, 4, 8, 9), lead vocals (3–7), arrangements
 Gary Lunn – bass
 David Huff – drums, percussion

Additional musicians
 Phil Naish – keyboards (10)
 Dennis Holt – Simmons drums (2, 6, 8), percussion (6)
 Ronn Huff – string arrangements (5)
 The Nashville String Machine – strings (5)
 Steve Green – backing vocals (7, 10)
Choir on "We Are His Hands"

 Bob Bailey
 Scott Wesley Brown
 Gary Chapman
 Chris Christian
 Jovonne Douglas
 Scott Douglas
 Bob Farrell
 Amy Grant
 Steve Green
 David Meece
 Billy Smiley
 Debi Smiley
 Russ Taff
 Kathy Troccoli
 Tricia Walker

Production 

 White Heart – producers
 Chris Christian – executive producer
 Jeff Balding – recording
 Doug Sarrett – assistant engineer
 Bill Deaton – additional engineer
 Brent King – additional engineer
 Mike Psanos – additional engineer
 Jack Joseph Puig – mixing
 Gold Mine Studio, Nashville, Tennessee – recording location, mixing location
 Doug Sax – mastering at The Mastering Lab, Los Angeles, California
 Bill Brunt – art direction, design, cover concept
 Mark Tucker – photography, cover concept
 Kent Hunter – cover concept
 Ellen Hodnett – Vital Signs logo
 Ken Wolgemuth – Vital Signs logo

Charts

Radio singles

References 

1984 albums
White Heart albums